Moving Hearts is the debut studio album recorded by Irish Celtic rock band Moving Hearts. The album features folk singer Christy Moore on vocals.

Track listing

"Hiroshima Nagasaki Russian Roulette" (Jim Page) – 4:22
"Irish Ways and Irish Laws" (John Gibbs) – 3:47 
"McBrides" (Declan Sinnott, Dónal Lunny) – 3:05
"Before the Deluge" (Jackson Browne) – 5:40
"Landlord" (Jim Page) – 2:41
"Category" (Declan Sinnott, Dónal Lunny) – 2:55
"Faithful Departed" (Philip Chevron) – 4:44
"Lake of Shadows" (Declan Sinnott, Dónal Lunny, Eoghan O'Neill) – 4:45
"No Time for Love" (Jack Warshaw) – 7:20

Personnel
Moving Hearts
Christy Moore - vocals, guitar, bodhrán
Dónal Lunny - vocals, bouzouki, synthesiser
Declan Sinnott - lead guitar, acoustic, vocals
Tony Davis - backing vocals
Eoghan O'Neill - bass guitar, vocals
Brian Calnan - drums, percussion
Davy Spillane - Uilleann pipes, low whistle
Keith Donald - tenor and soprano saxophone
Nollaig Casey (credited as Nollaig Ni Cathasaigh) - violin

References

External links
 Official website.

1981 debut albums
Moving Hearts albums